Elizabeth Moody (née Bromley, 29 October 1939 – 12 January 2010) was an English-born New Zealand film, television and theatre actress and director.

Career
Born in Worthing, Sussex, England, on 29 October 1939, Moody emigrated to New Zealand, becoming a naturalised New Zealander in 1957. She first came to note nationally in New Zealand during the late 1970s and early 1980s as a regular panellist on the television show Beauty and the Beast hosted by Selwyn Toogood. Her first feature film role was playing Mabel in The Scarecrow. She also played in Undercover Gang, Braindead, Turn of the Blade, and Heavenly Creatures. Her last film role was playing in Peter Jackson's The Lord of the Rings: The Fellowship of the Ring as the character Lobelia Sackville-Baggins.

Death
Moody had been diagnosed with an abscess on the brain and stayed in the hospital for almost three weeks when she died from pneumonia on 12 January 2010. She is survived by her husband, Terence Moody, and other family members.

Filmography

Feature films
 The Scarecrow – Mabel (1982)
 Undercover Gang – Mrs. Marwick (1986)
 Braindead – Vera Cosgrove (1992)
 Turn of the Blade – Girl in Headshots and Auditions (1994)
 Heavenly Creatures – Miss Waller (1994)
 The Lord of the Rings: The Fellowship of the Ring - Lobelia Sackville-Baggins (2001) (Only Extended Version)
 Offensive Behaviour - Crystal (2004)
 Huhu Attack! - Aunty Maude (2010)

Television
 Beauty and the Beast (TVNZ): 1976–1985. Panellist
 Antiques for Love or Money (TVNZ): Panellist
 The Fire Raiser (TVNZ): 1987

References

External links
 Elizabeth Moody Dies
 

1939 births
2010 deaths
People from Worthing
English emigrants to New Zealand
Naturalised citizens of New Zealand
New Zealand actresses